Melissa's yellow-eared bat (Vampyressa melissa) is a species of bat in the family Phyllostomidae. It is found in southern Colombia, Ecuador and Peru.

References

Vampyressa
Mammals of Colombia
Mammals of Ecuador
Mammals of Peru
Mammals described in 1926
Taxonomy articles created by Polbot
Bats of South America
Taxa named by Oldfield Thomas